"" (A furtive tear) is the romanza from act 2, scene 3 of the Italian opera L'elisir d'amore by Gaetano Donizetti. It is sung by Nemorino (tenor) when it appears that the love potion he bought to win the heart of his dream lady, Adina, is working. He loves Adina, but she is not interested in an innocent, rustic man such as he. To win her heart, he buys a love potion with all the money he has in his pocket. It is actually a cheap red wine sold by a traveling quack doctor—but when he sees Adina weeping, he assumes the "elixir" has worked and she has fallen in love with him.

Music

In an opera about fake potions and feigned emotions, Donizetti invests this aria with considerable pathos. It is set in B minor, a dark key with often tragic associations.

It changes to B major on the words "Cielo! Si può morir!". Its vocal range is from F to A with a tessitura of B to A.The last occurrence of the word chiedo is a coloratura melisma of 24 notes covering F to G.

Libretto 

The Italian text is taken from a score and libretto at Indiana University. They do not include the last line, "", which is heard in most of the romanza's performances.

 
Una furtiva lagrima
negli occhi suoi spuntò:
Quelle festose giovani
invidiar sembrò.

Che più cercando io vo?
Che più cercando io vo?
M'ama! Sì, m'ama,
lo vedo, lo vedo.

Un solo istante i palpiti
del suo bel cor sentir!
I miei sospir confondere
per poco a' suoi sospir!
I palpiti, i palpiti sentir,
confondere i miei co' suoi sospir.

Cielo, si può morir;
di più non chiedo, non chiedo.
Ah, cielo! Si può! Si può morir!
Di più non chiedo, non chiedo.
Si può morir! Si può morir d'amor.
Literal translation
A furtive tear
in her eyes appeared:
Those festive young girls
she seemed to envy.

What more need I look for?
What more need I look for?
She loves me! Yes, she loves me,
I see it, I see it.

For a single instant the beats
of her beautiful heart to hear!
My sighs to blend
for a while with her sighs!
Her heartbeats, her heartbeats to hear,
my sighs with hers to merge.

Heavens! One could die!
More I cannot ask, I cannot ask.
Oh, heavens! One could, one could die!
More I cannot ask, I cannot ask.
One could die! One could die of love!
Poetic translation
Softly a furtive teardrop fell,
shadowed her sparkling eyes;
Seeing the others follow me
has caused her jealous sighs.

What is there more to prize?
What more than this could I prize?
Sighing, she loves me,
I saw that she loves me.

Could I but feel her heart on mine,
breathing that tender sigh!
Could my own sighing comfort her,
and whisper in sweet reply!
Her heart on mine, as heart to heart we sigh.
So tenderly we'd share a sweet reply!

Heaven, I then could die;
no more I'd ask you, I'd ask you,
ah! heaven, I, then, I then could die;
no more I'd ask you, I'd ask you.
I then could die, I then could die of love.

References

External links 
 
 , Roberto Alagna

Arias by Gaetano Donizetti
Opera excerpts
1832 compositions
Compositions in B-flat minor
Tenor arias
Arias in Italian